Maniraptora is a clade of coelurosaurian dinosaurs which includes the birds and the non-avian dinosaurs that were more closely related to them than to Ornithomimus velox. It contains the major subgroups Avialae, Deinonychosauria, Oviraptorosauria and Therizinosauria. Ornitholestes and the Alvarezsauroidea are also often included. Together with the next closest sister group, the Ornithomimosauria, Maniraptora comprises the more inclusive clade Maniraptoriformes. Maniraptorans first appear in the fossil record during the Jurassic Period (see Eshanosaurus), and survive today as living birds.

Description

Maniraptorans are characterized by long arms and three-fingered hands (though reduced or fused in some lineages), as well as a "half-moon shaped" (semi-lunate) bone in the wrist (carpus). In 2004, Tom Holtz and Halszka Osmólska pointed out six other maniraptoran characters relating to specific details of the skeleton. Unlike most other saurischian dinosaurs, which have pubic bones that point forward, several groups of maniraptorans have an ornithischian-like backwards-pointing hip bone. A backward-pointing hip characterizes the therizinosaurs, dromaeosaurids, avialans, and some primitive troodontids. The fact that the backward-pointing hip is present in so many diverse maniraptoran groups has led most scientists to conclude that the "primitive" forward-pointing hip seen in advanced troodontids and oviraptorosaurs is an evolutionary reversal, and that these groups evolved from ancestors with backward-pointing hips.

Technical diagnosis
Holtz and Osmólska (2004) diagnosed the clade Maniraptora based on the following characters: reduced or absent olecranon process of the ulna, greater trochanter and cranial trochanter of the femur fused into a trochanteric crest. An elongated, backwards-pointing pubic bone is present in therizinosauroids, dromaeosaurids, avialans, and the basal troodontid Sinovenator, which suggests that the propubic condition in advanced troodontids and oviraptorosaurs is a reversal. Turner et al. (2007) named seven synapomorphies that diagnose Maniraptora.

Feathers and flight

Modern pennaceous feathers and remiges are known in the advanced maniraptoran group Aviremigia. More primitive maniraptorans, such as therizinosaurs (specifically Beipiaosaurus), preserve a combination of simple downy filaments and unique elongated quills. Simple feathers are known from more primitive coelurosaurs such as Sinosauropteryx prima, and possibly from even more distantly related species such as the ornithischian Tianyulong confuciusi and the flying pterosaurs. Thus it appears as if some form of feathers or down-like integument would have been present in all maniraptorans, at least when they were young.

Maniraptora is the only dinosaur group known to include flying members, though how far back in this lineage flight extends is controversial. Powered and/or gliding flight is believed to have been present in some types of dromaeosaurid, such as Rahonavis and Microraptor. Zhenyuanlong suni, a dromaeosaurid, was too heavy to fly but still had wings with feathers required for flying, which suggests its ancestors had the ability for aerial locomotion. Other groups, like the Oviraptorosauria who had a tail with pygostyle like features, are not known to have been capable of flight, but some scientists have suggested that they could be descended from ancestors which flew. Gregory S. Paul has suggested that this might be the case. Paul has gone as far as to propose that Therizinosauria, Alvarezsauroidea, and the non-maniraptoran group Ornithomimosauria descended from flying ancestors as well.

Classification
The Maniraptora was originally named by Jacques Gauthier in 1986, for a branch-based clade defined as all dinosaurs closer to modern birds than to the ornithomimids. Gauthier noted that this group could be easily characterized by their long forelimbs and hands, which he interpreted as adaptations for grasping (hence the name Maniraptora, which means "hand snatchers" in relation to their 'seizing hands'). In 1994, Thomas R. Holtz attempted to define the group based on the characteristics of the hand and wrist alone (an apomorphy-based definition), and included the long, thin fingers, bowed, wing-like forearm bones, and half-moon shaped wrist bone as key characters. Most subsequent studies have not followed this definition, however, preferring the earlier branch-based definition.

The branch-based definition usually includes the major groups Deinonychosauria, Oviraptorosauria, Therizinosauria, and Aves. Other taxa often found to be maniraptorans include the alvarezsaurs and Ornitholestes. Several taxa have been assigned to the Maniraptora more definitively, though their exact placement within the group remains uncertain. These forms include the scansoriopterygids, Pedopenna, and Yixianosaurus, and the dubious Bradycneme (which turned out to be an alvarezsaur).

In 1993, Perle and colleagues coined the name Metornithes to include alvarezsaurids and modern birds, which the researchers believed were members of the Avialae. This group was defined as a clade by Luis Chiappe in 1995 as the last common ancestor of Mononykus and modern birds, and all its descendants.

The following cladogram follows the results of a phylogenetic study by Cau et al., 2015.

Alternative interpretations
In 2002, Czerkas and Yuan reported that some maniraptoran traits, such as a long, backwards-pointed pubis, short ischia, as well as a perforated acetabulum (a hip socket that is a hole) are apparently absent in Scansoriopteryx. The authors considered it to be more primitive than true theropods, and hypothesized that maniraptorans may have branched off from theropods at a very early point, or may even have descended from pre-theropod dinosaurs. Zhang et al., in describing the closely related or conspecific specimen Epidendrosaurus (now considered a synonym of Scansoriopteryx), did not report any of the primitive traits mentioned by Czerkas and Yuan, but did find that the shoulder blade of Epidendrosaurus appeared primitive. Despite this, they placed Epidendrosaurus firmly within Maniraptora.

Paleobiology

Diet

Scientists have traditionally assumed that maniraptorans were ancestrally hypercarnivorous, that is, that most non-avialan species primarily ate and hunted only other vertebrates. However, a number of discoveries made during the first decade of the 21st century, as well as re-evaluation of older evidence, began to suggest that maniraptorans were a primarily omnivorous group, including a number of sub-groups that ate mainly plants, insects, or other food sources besides meat. Additionally, phylogenetic studies of maniraptoran relationships began to more consistently show that herbivorous or omnivorous groups were spread throughout the Maniraptora, rather than representing a single side-branch as previously thought. This led scientists such as Lindsay Zanno to conclude that the ancestral maniraptoran must have been omnivorous, giving rise to several purely herbivorous groups (such as the therizinosaurs, primitive oviraptorosaurs, and some avialans) and that, among non-avians, only one group reverted to pure carnivores (the dromaeosaurids). Most other groups fell somewhere in between the two extremes, with alvarezsaurids and some avialans being insectivorous, and with advanced oviraptorosaurs and troodontids being omnivorous.

References

 
Late Jurassic dinosaurs
Jurassic birds
Cretaceous birds
Cenozoic birds
Oxfordian first appearances
Extant Late Jurassic first appearances
Taxa named by Jacques Gauthier